The Quickening may refer to:

Music

Albums 
 The Quickening (The Vandals album)
 The Quickening (Kathryn Williams album)
 The Quickening (Jim White and Marisa Anderson album)
 The Quickening, an album by Adelaide hip-hop group Funkoars
 The Quickening, an album by American record producer David Leonard

Songs 
 "The Quickening", a song by Latyrx on their album The Album
 "The Quickening", a song by Bad Religion on their album The Empire Strikes First
 "The Quickening", a song by Cinematrik for the game Hacknet

Film and television
 "The Quickening" (Star Trek: Deep Space Nine), an episode of the science fiction TV series Star Trek: Deep Space Nine
 Highlander II: The Quickening, the second installment to the Highlander film series

Literature
 The Quickening: Today's Trends, Tomorrow's World, a book written by Art Bell
 The Quickening (series), a fantasy novel series by Fiona McIntosh
"The Quickening" (short story), a short story by Michael Bishop

See also
 Quickening (disambiguation)